Sir Arthur Ernest Streeton (8 April 1867 – 1 September 1943) was an Australian landscape painter and a leading member of the Heidelberg School, also known as Australian Impressionism.

Early life
Streeton was born in Mount Duneed, Victoria, south-west of Geelong, on 8 April 1867 the fourth child of Charles Henry and Mary (née Johnson) Streeton. His family moved to Richmond in 1874. His parents had met on the voyage from England in 1854. In 1882, Streeton commenced art studies with G. F. Folingsby at the National Gallery School. On 2 June 1890, he sailed to Sydney, and stayed there with his sister in the suburb of Summer Hill.

Streeton was influenced by French Impressionism and the works of J.M.W. Turner. During this time he began his association with fellow artists Frederick McCubbin and Tom Roberts – at Melbourne including at Box Hill and Heidelberg. In 1885 Streeton presented his first exhibition at the Victorian Academy of Art. He found employment as an apprentice lithographer under Charles Troedel.

Career

Eaglemont camp, Heidelberg

In the summer drought of 1888, Streeton travelled by train to the attractive agricultural and grazing suburb of Heidelberg, 11 km north-east of Melbourne's city centre. He intended to walk the remaining distance to the site where Louis Buvelot painted his 1866 work Summer afternoon near Templestowe, which Streeton considered "the first fine landscape painted in Victoria". On the return journey to Heidelberg, wet canvas in hand, Streeton met Charles Davies, brother-in-law of friend and fellow plein air painter David Davies. Charles gave him "artistic possession" of an abandoned homestead atop the summit of Mount Eagle estate, offering spectacular views across the Yarra Valley to the Dandenongs. For Streeton, Eaglemont (as it became known) was the ideal working environment—a reasonably isolated rural location accessible by public transport. The house itself could be seen by visitors as they arrived at Heidelberg railway station.

Streeton spent the first few nights at Eaglemont alone with the estate's tenant farmer Jack Whelan (who appears in Streeton's "pioneer" painting The selector's hut (Whelan on the log), 1890), and slept upon the floor, the rooms being bare of furniture. Of his first few nights at the house, Streeton said it was "creaking and ghostly. A long dark corridor seemed full of past visions, and out of doors a blurred rich blackness against the sharp brilliance of the Southern Cross ... But tobacco and wine weighed healthily against the darkness". He descended the hill daily to Heidelberg village for meals before jaunting into the bush with a billycan of milk and swag of paints and canvases. The first artists to paint with Streeton at Eaglemont were the National Gallery students Aby Altson and John Llewellyn Jones, followed by John Mather and Walter Withers. Like Streeton, Withers painted from nature amidst suburban bush around Melbourne, employing earthy colours with loose, impressionistic brushstrokes. By the end of 1888, he became a weekend visitor to the camp.

Streeton was exhibiting and perhaps painting in the studio of his friend Tom Roberts in the Grosvenor Chambers in Collins Street by May 1888.

About the same time, Streeton met the artist Charles Conder, who travelled down from Sydney in October 1888 at the invitation of Tom Roberts. One year Streeton's junior, Conder was already a committed plein airist, having been influenced by the painterly techniques of expatriate impressionist Girolamo Nerli. Conder and Roberts joined Streeton at Eaglemont in January 1889 and helped make some modest improvements to the house. Despite austere living conditions, Streeton felt content: "Surrounded by the loveliness of the new landscape, with heat, drought, and flies, and hard pressed for the necessaries of life, we worked hard, and were a happy trio." Streeton and Conder quickly became friends and influenced one another's art. Their shared love of South Australian poet Adam Lindsay Gordon's lyrical verse is revealed in the titles of some of their Eaglemont paintings, including Streeton's romantic gloaming work ′Above us the great grave sky′ (1890, taken from Gordon's poem "Doubtful Dreams"). Later, critics would describe some of the pair's Eaglemont paintings as companion pieces, as both artists often painted the same views and subjects using a high-keyed "gold and blue" palette, which Streeton considered "nature's scheme of colour in Australia".

Two of Streeton's best-known works were painted during this period—Golden Summer, Eaglemont (1889) and ′Still glides the stream, and shall for ever glide′ (1890)—each a sunlit pastoral scene of golden-paddocked plains stretching to the distant blue Corhanwarrabul. In 1891, Arthur Merric and Emma Minnie of the Boyd artistic dynasty took Golden Summer, Eaglemont to Europe where it became the first painting by an Australian-born artist to be exhibited at the Royal Academy, London, and was awarded a Mention honourable at the 1892 Paris Salon.

Sydney
Streeton came to Sydney and lived at Curlew Camp, from around 1891 until he left Australia for England, although during this period he also travelled widely in rural New South Wales. As well as painting scenes of Sydney Harbour and Coogee, and urban scenes of Sydney, it was during this period that he painted his Hawkesbury River series of paintings and [[Fire's on|'Fire's on''']].

In 1893 Streeton wrote in Sydney's Daily Telegraph criticizing a proposed  development on the shores of Sydney Harbor to establish a colliery which would involve the cutting down of a great many gum trees by a mining company. His letter, which came to be known as "Streeton's shriek" resulted in public alarm and a cessation of the project.<ref>{{Cite web|url=https://www.themonthly.com.au/issue/2020/december/1606741200/tim-bonyhady/streeton-s-shriek|title="Streeton's shriek" by Tim Bonyhady, The Monthly' 'December 2020-January 2021|date=December 2020|access-date=28 March 2021}}</ref>

Travels to England
In 1897 Streeton sailed for London on the Polynesian, stopping at Port Said before continuing on via Cairo and Naples. He held an exhibition at the Royal Academy in 1900 and became a member of the Chelsea Arts Club in 1903. Although he had developed a considerable reputation in Australia, he failed to achieve the same success in England. His trips to London were financed by the sales of his paintings at home in Australia. His time in England reinforced a strong sense of patriotism towards the British Empire and, like many, anticipated the coming war with Germany with some enthusiasm. In 1906, Streeton returned to Australia and completed some paintings at Mount Macedon in February 1907 while staying with his patrons the Pinschofs at Hohe Warte.These included the notable five feet by three feet Australia Felix (a view from Mt. Toorong) and a number of other smaller paintings. He returned to London in October. Paintings done in Venice in September 1908, including The Grand Canal, were exhibited in Australia in July 1909 as "Arthur Streeton's Venice". In Australia again in April 1914 he held exhibitions in Sydney and Melbourne and went back to England in early 1915.

War artist

Along with other members of the Chelsea Arts Club, including Tom Roberts, he joined the Royal Army Medical Corps (British Army) at the age of 48. He worked at the 3rd London General Hospital in Wandsworth and reached the rank of corporal.

Streeton was made an Australian Official War Artist with the Australian Imperial Force, holding the rank of Honorary Lieutenant, and he travelled to France on 14 May 1918 and was attached to the 2nd Division, receiving his movement order on 8 May 1918. He worked in France, with a break in August, until October 1918. Expected by the Commonwealth to produce sketches and drawings that were "descriptive", Streeton concentrated on the landscape of the scenes of war and did not attempt to convey the human suffering. Unlike the more famous military art depicting the definitive moments of battle, Streeton produced "military still life", capturing the everyday moments of the war. Streeton explained what was at that time an unconventional point of view – a perspective which was based in experience:

Two paintings from this period, Villers Bretonneux (1918) and Boulogne (1918), are in the collection of the Art Gallery of New South Wales.

Later years
After the war, Streeton resumed painting in the Grampians and Dandenong Ranges. Streeton built a house on five acres (20,000 m²) at Olinda in the Dandenongs where he continued to paint. He won the Wynne Prize in 1928 with Afternoon Light, Goulburn Valley. He was an art critic for The Argus from 1929 to 1935 and in 1937 was knighted for services to the arts. He married Esther Leonora Clench, a Canadian violinist, in 1908. Streeton died in September 1943. He is buried at Ferntree Gully cemetery.

Legacy

Streeton Drive, a main thoroughfare in Weston Creek is named after Sir Arthur, as is Streeton Primary School, in the Melbourne suburb of Yallambie.

There is also a memorial for Streeton just outside Geelong, Victoria.

In 2008, three expatriate Australian classical musicians living in Geneva, Switzerland founded a piano trio they named the Streeton Trio after the painter.

Streeton's works appear in many major Australian galleries and museums, including the National Gallery of Australia and state galleries, and the Australian War Memorial. In September 2015, Streeton's Coogee clifftop landscape Blue Pacific (1890) became the first painting by an Australian artist, and only the second painting by a Western artist outside Europe, to hang in the permanent collection of the National Gallery, London. It sits alongside major impressionist works by Claude Monet and Édouard Manet.

Prices 
Streeton's paintings are amongst the most collectible of Australian artists and attracted high prices during his lifetime. Golden Summer, Eaglemont sold for around 1000 guineas in 1924 and in 1995 it was bought in a private sale by the National Gallery of Australia for A$3.5 million, both times setting a sales record for an Australian painting. In 1985, Settler's Camp sold at auction for A$800,000 and this remained the record auction price for Streeton's work until 23 May 2005, when his 1890 painting, Sunlight Sweet, Coogee, was sold for A$2.04 million (A$1.853 million before tax), becoming only the second painting by an Australian artist to exceed the A$2 million mark at auction (after Frederick McCubbin's 1892 work Bush Idyll, which sold for A$2.3 million in 1998). The painting was part of the Foster's Group collection and was sold at auction by Sotheby's.  That record was eclipsed when, on 21 April 2021, Streeton's The Grand Canal, 1908 was auctioned in Melbourne for A$3.068 million.

Gallery

References

External links

Artist's footsteps – Arthur Streeton
Arthur Streeton at the Art Gallery of New South Wales
Arthur Streeton at Australian Art
Arthur Streeton on Picture Australia
 Dictionary of Australian Art, Arthur Streeton
Images
 The domes of St. Mark's (1908)

1867 births
1943 deaths
19th-century Australian painters
19th-century Australian male artists
20th-century Australian painters
20th-century Australian male artists
Australian Knights Bachelor
Australian landscape painters
Australian people of English descent
Australian war artists
Heidelberg School
Members of the Royal Institute of Oil Painters
Orientalist painters
 
People from Geelong
World War I artists
Wynne Prize winners
British Army personnel of World War I
Royal Army Medical Corps soldiers
Australian military personnel of World War I
Australian Army officers
Australian male painters
People from Richmond, Victoria
National Gallery of Victoria Art School alumni
Military personnel from Victoria (Australia)